Tummapudi is a village in Guntur district of the Indian state of Andhra Pradesh. It is located in Duggirala mandal of Tenali revenue division.

Geography 
Tummapudi is situated to the north of the mandal headquarters, Duggirala,

Government and politics 

Tummapudi gram panchayat is the local self-government of the village. It is divided into wards and each ward is represented by a ward member. The village forms a part of Andhra Pradesh Capital Region and is under the jurisdiction of APCRDA.

Education 

As per the school information report for the academic year 2018–19, the village has a total of 7 schools. These schools include 1 private and 6 Zilla Parishad/Mandal Parishad schools.

See also 
List of villages in Guntur district

References 

Villages in Guntur district